Erling Bager, born 1946, is a Swedish Liberal People's Party politician, member of the Riksdag 1985–1998 and then again 2002–2006.

References

1946 births
Living people
Members of the Riksdag from the Liberals (Sweden)
Members of the Riksdag 1985–1988
Members of the Riksdag 1988–1991
Members of the Riksdag 1991–1994
Members of the Riksdag 1994–1998
Members of the Riksdag 2002–2006
20th-century Swedish politicians
21st-century Swedish politicians